The 2016 United Kingdom budget was delivered by George Osborne, the Chancellor of the Exchequer, to the House of Commons on Wednesday, 16 March 2016.

It was the second fully Conservative budget delivered by Osborne, after the July 2015 budget. This was to be Osborne's last budget as Chancellor, as he was replaced by Philip Hammond on 13 July by way of Theresa May's cabinet reshuffle.

Background
In the November 2015 Autumn Statement, the independent Office for Budget Responsibility predicted that the UK economy would grow by 2.4% in 2016.

Budget announcements
 Osborne will introduce a sugar tax on soft drinks from 2018, raising around half a billion pounds which will be used to fund after-school activities such as sport and art.
 The predicted GDP growth for 2016 was lowered to 2% from 2.4%.
 The tax-free allowance will be raised to £11,500 and the 40p tax threshold will increase to £45,000.
 There will be a new savings account, the Lifetime ISA, for the under-40s, with the government putting in £1 for every £4 saved.
 Funding was earmarked for High Speed 3 (an east-west rail line across the North of England), Crossrail 2 (a north-south rail line across London), a road tunnel across the Pennines and upgrades to the M62 motorway.
 £115 million was allocated to tackle rough sleeping.
Public sector employers will be required to contribute a higher proportion to their workers' pensions from 2019–2020.
 Tobacco duty was increased by 2%.
Hand rolling tobacco duty was increased by 3%.
Fuel duty frozen at 57.95p per litre.
 VAT on tampons was to be cut from 5% to 0%, as soon as EU obligations allowed. (The tax on women's sanitary products was abolished on 1 January 2021, when the transitional Brexit period expired.)
 The halving of tolls across both Severn Bridges from 2018.

2016–17 taxes and spending

Taxes

Spending

Reactions
The Leader of the Opposition, Jeremy Corbyn, described the budget as having "unfairness at its very core", singling out cuts to disability benefits and corporate tax for particular criticism. However, he expressed his approval for the introduction of the sugar levy in his House of Commons response.

Secretary of State for Work and Pensions, Iain Duncan Smith, resigned two days after the presentation of the budget, describing planned cuts within his department "as a compromise too far".

See also
 Budget of the United Kingdom

References 

March 2016 events in the United Kingdom
2016
2016 in British politics
2016 government budgets
George Osborne